Anatrachyntis holotherma is a moth in the family Cosmopterigidae. In 1936 it was described by Edward Meyrick and is known from the Democratic Republic of the Congo.

References

Moths described in 1936
Anatrachyntis
Moths of Africa